IIT (Indian Institutes of Technology) is a group of higher education institutes, India.

IIT may also refer to:

Educational institutes
 Mindanao State University – Iligan Institute of Technology, a research university in the Philippines
 Illinois Institute of Technology, a research university in Chicago, Illinois, United States
 Indiana Institute of Technology, Fort Wayne, Indiana, United States
 Informatics Institute of Technology, Wellawatta, Sri Lanka
 Inha Institute of Technology, the parent institution of Inha University, Incheon, Korea
 Institute for Industrial Technology, a technical vocational school in Lagos, Nigeria
 Institute for Information Technology, a research institute of the National Research Council of Canada
 Institute of Information Technology, University of Dhaka, Dhaka, Bangladesh
 Institute of Information Technology, Noakhali Science and Technology University, Noakhali, Bangladesh
 IIT Madrid (Instituto de Investigación Tecnológica), a research institute in Madrid, Spain
 International Institute of Technology, the previous name of Sirindhorn International Institute of Technology, Pathum Thani, Thailand
 Islamic Institute of Toronto, Toronto, Canada
 Technion – Israel Institute of Technology, a research university in Haifa, Israel
 Istituto Italiano di Tecnologia, Genoa, Italy
 İzmir Institute of Technology, İzmir, Turkey

Other uses
 Infantry Immersion Trainer, a mixed reality training facility prototype
 Integrated Information Technology, a semiconductor company, now 8x8, Inc.
 Integrated information theory, a theoretical framework for consciousness
 Intra-industry trade, the exchange of products belonging to the same industry
 Indosat's NYSE ticker symbol
 I-It relationship, from I and Thou, a book by Martin Buber

See also
IIIT (disambiguation)
ITT (disambiguation)